The Little Two Hearted River is a  river located entirely within Luce County in the U.S. state of Michigan.

The river is entirely located within McMillan Township and is passed over along County Road 412 travelling eastward from Pine Stump Junction to Crisp Point Light.

See also
List of rivers of Michigan

References

Michigan  Streamflow Data from the USGS

Rivers of Michigan
Rivers of Luce County, Michigan
Tributaries of Lake Superior